The court-martial of Howard Levy occurred in 1967. Howard Levy (born April 10, 1937) was a United States Army doctor who became an early resister to the Vietnam War. In 1967, he was court-martialed at Fort Jackson, South Carolina, for refusing an order to train Green Beret medics on their way to Vietnam. He said it "became clear to me that the Army [was using medics] to 'win hearts and minds' in Vietnamese villages - while still burning them to the ground in search-and-destroy missions." He considered the Special Forces (Green Berets) "killers of peasants and murderers of women and children".

Early life and education
Howard B. Levy grew up in Brooklyn, New York, the son of a salesman. He went to New Utrecht High School and then New York University. He got his medical training at the SUNY Downstate College of Medicine (1961) and interned at the Maimonides Medical Center. He was commissioned as a reserve officer in the Army Medical Corps in 1962, but was deferred until the end of his medical residency in July 1965, at which time he was sent directly to Fort Jackson.

Court-martial, Nuremberg Defense and appeals
A noteworthy aspect of this case was that Levy's attorney, Charles Morgan Jr., raised the Nuremberg Defense, arguing that U.S. troops were committing war crimes in Vietnam and that American soldiers could lawfully refuse to obey orders related to Vietnam service. The Nuremberg trials of Nazi Leaders, which took place after World War II, held that soldiers involved in war crimes could be held liable even though under orders from a superior.

Levy's defense became national news and a cause célèbre among opponents of the Vietnam War because it was based on "both the illegality of the Vietnam War and the Nuremberg principle requiring non-participation in war crimes." The military court disagreed, sentencing Levy to three years at Fort Leavenworth for "conduct unbecoming an officer and a gentleman" and disloyal statements prejudicial to "good order and discipline." The court did, however, admit evidence of war crimes into testimony. The presiding law officer, Colonel Earl V Brown, surprisingly, allowed both the Nuremberg Defense and testimony in private session that Green Berets were engaged in war crimes in Vietnam. Despite this, because there was no testimony that Green Beret medics were involved in criminal activity or that their medical training was being used for such activity, the evidence was ruled irrelevant and, therefore, inadmissible in open court. Levy described this experience years later: "We tried to put the war on trial, but the military court said the truth is no defense."

Levy was released after serving more than two years in prison, but his case continued on through the courts. The first review by a Federal District Court affirmed his conviction. Then, in April 1973, The United States Court of Appeals for the Third Circuit reversed the decision on the grounds that the two key provisions of the Uniform Code of Military Justice that led to the conviction "were so vague as to be unconstitutional." The very next year, on June 19, 1974, in Parker v. Levy the Supreme Court reinstated Levy’s conviction with a controversial 5-3 decision. Parker v. Levy remains the legal foundation for recognition of "military necessity" as "a weightier interest than First Amendment rights of individuals in the military." Justice William O. Douglas dissented, arguing that “Uttering one’s belief is sacrosanct under the First Amendment.” After hearing about the verdict, Levy was quoted as saying: "I was unjustly court‐martialed, unjustly sentenced, ...unjustly spent two and a half years in prison, and I believe the Supreme Court ruling was unjust.”

Later career and personal reflections
In 2002, The New York Times interviewed him and found he had "no regrets" over his actions, and that he still considered the Vietnam War "criminal, senseless mayhem." For many years he had been the director of dermatology at New York City's Lincoln Medical and Mental Health Center in the Bronx. He was "still critical of America's use of military force, as in Afghanistan and possibly in Iraq." He also told the Times that "he felt an affinity with those Israeli army reservists who have said they would refuse to serve in the West Bank and Gaza Strip because of Israeli treatment of the Palestinians".

See also
 A Matter of Conscience
 Concerned Officers Movement
 Court-martial of Susan Schnall
 Donald W. Duncan
 Fort Hood Three
 FTA Show - 1971 anti-Vietnam War road show for GIs
 F.T.A. - documentary film about the FTA Show
 GI's Against Fascism
 GI Coffeehouses
 GI Underground Press
 List of peace activists
 Movement for a Democratic Military
 Opposition to United States involvement in the Vietnam War
 Presidio mutiny
 Sir! No Sir!, a documentary about the anti-war movement within the ranks of the United States Armed Forces
 Stop Our Ship (SOS) anti-Vietnam War movement in and around the U.S. Navy
 Vietnam Veterans Against the War
 Waging Peace in Vietnam
 Winter Soldier Investigation

References

External links
 Sir! No Sir!, a film about GI resistance to the Vietnam War
 Howard Levy oral history from A Matter of Conscience - GI Resistance During the Vietnam War
 Waging Peace in Vietnam - US Soldiers and Veterans Who Opposed the War
 A Matter of Conscience - GI Resistance During the Vietnam War
 Waging Peace in Vietnam Interviews with GI resisters

Anti–Vietnam War groups
Opposition to United States involvement in the Vietnam War
United States Army personnel of the Vietnam War
New York University alumni
People from Brooklyn
United States Army Medical Corps officers
New Utrecht High School alumni
SUNY Downstate College of Medicine alumni
Military personnel from New York City
Court-martial cases